Fremont Township is a township in Lyon County, Kansas, United States.

History
Fremont Township was founded in 1859.

References

Townships in Lyon County, Kansas
Townships in Kansas